The siege of Tlemcen from 1335 to 1337 was a military operation undertaken by the Marinid sultan ''''''Abu al-Hasan Ali ibn Othman against the capital of the Zayyanid kingdom. The siege begain in 1335, and ended with the fall of the city to the Marinids in 1337. The Zianid sultan, Abu Tashfîn and his three sons died in battle. The victory of Abu al-Hasan led to the annexation of the kingdom of Tlemcen to the Marinid Empire for a more than a decade.

References 

Marinid Sultanate
History of Morocco
Zayyanid dynasty
History of Algeria